Bishop Cyryl Klimowicz (born November 5, 1952 in Amangeldy, near Almaty, Kazakhstan) is the Ordinary of the Roman Catholic Diocese of Saint Joseph at Irkutsk.

Life and career
Klimowicz was born in Kazakhstan to Polish parents. From 1956 to 1965 he lived in the Belarusian Soviet Socialist Republic, and later he moved with his family to Poland. After graduating from high school in 1974 he entered the Major Seminary «Hosianum» in the city of Olsztyn (Poland), from which he graduated in 1980. He was ordained as priest on June 8, 1980 by the Primate of Poland Cardinal Józef Glemp.

After his ordination, Klimowicz served as vicar in the cities Wydminy, Pasłęk and Klewki under Olsztyn; in this period he participated in the construction of a new seminary in Olsztyn, Poland. In July 1990 he became rector and dean of Głębokie in the archdiocese of Minsk-Mogilev (Belarus).

On October 13, 1999, Pope John Paul II appointed Klimowicz as auxiliary bishop to the Roman Catholic Archdiocese of Minsk-Mohilev, Titular Bishop of Arban (October 13, 1999 - April 17, 2003). On December 4, 1999, in the Cathedral of the Blessed Virgin Mary at Minsk, he was consecrated as bishop by Cardinal Kazimierz Świątek.

From 1999 to 2003 Bishop Klimowicz was Vicar General of the Minsk-Mogilev Archdiocese and rector of the Cathedral in Minsk. On April 17, 2003, Pope John Paul II appointed him as diocesan bishop of the Diocese of Saint Joseph with the center in Irkutsk. On June 15, 2003 in Irkutsk Cathedral of the Immaculate Heart of the Mother of God, he was inaugurated as the new diocesan bishop.

On January 18, 2005 Bishop Klimowicz was appointed Vice-Chairman of the Conference of Catholic Bishops of Russia (KKER). He is Head of the Catechetical Commission and the Commission for inter-Christian and interreligious dialogue and dialogue with non-believers. He is fluent in Belarusian, Russian, Polish and Italian.

References

External links
 http://www.gazeta.ru/2003/04/17/last83283.shtml
 http://www.babr.ru/news/print.php?IDE=10928
 http://www.sibgerold.ru/circ_Klimovich.php
 https://web.archive.org/web/20050223124213/http://www.catholic.by/port/ru/news/2005-01-18.htm
 http://www.catholic-hierarchy.org/bishop/bklim.html

21st-century Roman Catholic bishops in Russia
1952 births
Living people
People from Jambyl Region
Kazakhstani people of Polish descent
Kazakhstani Christians